Akershus University College (HiAk) was a university college located in Kjeller, Norway. The institution is one of 25 public university colleges owned and run by the Norwegian state. It last had about 3,900 students and a staff of approximately 300. It merged with Oslo University College on 1 August 2011 to create Oslo and Akershus University College.

The college was divided into four faculties:
 Faculty of Nursing Education
 Faculty of Product Design 
 Faculty of Social Education
 Faculty of Technical and Vocational Teacher Education

 
Defunct universities and colleges in Norway
Organisations based in Skedsmo
Educational institutions established in 1994
1994 establishments in Norway
Educational institutions disestablished in 2011
2011 disestablishments in Norway